Rasa Budbergytė (born 8 May 1960) is a Lithuanian politician and a member of the Seimas. She previously served as state's Auditor General, member at European Court of Auditors and Minister of Finance.

Early life
Budbergytė was born on 8 May 1960 in Plungė. She went to  secondary schools in Plungė and Prienai before enrolling Faculty of Law at Vilnius University.

Career
During 1983–85, Budbergytė led the general affairs division of Marijampolė City Council. In September 1998, she was made the Vice-Minister of Justice, a post she retained till December 2000. She has also served as a legal adviser to the Ministry of International Economic Relations (1992–93) and Auditor General (2010–2010). She was an assistant professor at the Vilnius University from 1997 to 2005.

In 2016, she was briefly appointed to be the Minister of Finance of Lithuania, since the previous minister, Rimantas Šadžius replaced her at European Court of Auditors . She was a minister till new election. In  2016 Lithuanian parliamentary election she won a Seimas seat with Social Democratic Party of Lithuania. Currently she is the deputy chair of the Committee on European Affairs.

References

Lithuanian jurists
1960 births
Living people
21st-century Lithuanian women politicians
21st-century Lithuanian politicians
Members of the Seimas
Vilnius University alumni
Ministers of Finance of Lithuania
Female finance ministers
Women members of the Seimas